Justin Thompson (born 8 January 1969) is an Australian professional darts player who plays in the World Darts Federation events.

Career
A veteran of the DPA circuit, he won the WDF Asia-Pacific Cup Singles in 2016, plus the Geelong Classic. Winner DA Australian Mens Singles 2017 as well as two DPA Australian Pro Tour events in 2017.

Thompson competed in the 2018 BDO World Darts Championship, making his first appearance in the event against Chris Gilliland in the preliminary round, a match which he overcame Gilliland 3–2.

World Championship results

BDO/WDF
 2018: First round (lost to Darryl Fitton 2–3) (sets) 
 2019: First round (lost to Michael Unterbuchner 2–3)
 2020: First round (lost to Wayne Warren 2–3)
 2022: Second round (lost to Neil Duff 0–3)

References

External links
Profile and stats on Darts Database

1969 births
Living people
Australian darts players
British Darts Organisation players
Professional Darts Corporation associate players